The Honda Zest is a kei car released in 2006 by Honda. It is mechanically identical to the fifth generation Honda Life. Equipped with a turbo charged engine, 3 cylinders, and 4 doors, it was the first kei car available with optional side curtain airbags. It was available in two distinct versions — Zest and Zest Sports. During fall/winter 2008, the Zest Sports was replaced with the Zest Spark. Honda enlisted J-Pop mega-star Ayumi Hamasaki to promote the Zest Spark.  The Ayu x ZEST SPARK collaboration has come to the extent where the limited edition of the vehicle features Ayu's "A" logo, known as "A Style Package".

External links
 Honda announcement of ZEST
 Concept Carz info on ZEST

Subcompact cars
Zest
2000s cars
Kei cars
2010s cars